Mohammad Saddiq (born 20 September 1973) is a Pakistani born former Danish cricketer.  Saddiq was a right-handed batsman who played as a wicket-keeper.

Saddiq made his debut for Denmark in the 1994 ICC Trophy against Israel.  He played 3 further ICC Trophy matches for Denmark, all coming in that competition.  Saadiq made his List A debut for Denmark in the 1999 NatWest Trophy against the Kent Cricket Board.  His international List A debut for Denmark came in the 2000 ICC Emerging Nations Tournament against Zimbabwe A.  During the tournament he played 3 further List A matches against the Netherlands, Scotland and Kenya.  Saadiq's final List A match for Denmark came in the 1st round of the 2002 Cheltenham & Gloucester Trophy against Suffolk, which was played in 2001.  In his 6 List A matches for Denmark, he scored 97 runs at a batting average of 19.40, with a high score of 36.

References

External links
Mohammad Saddiq at ESPNcricinfo
Mohammad Saddiq at CricketArchive

1973 births
Living people
Pakistani emigrants to Denmark
Danish cricketers
Wicket-keepers